Christakis Christoforou (born 26 January 1964, Limassol) is a Cypriot football manager. He last managed Cyprus national football team.

Playing career

Christoforou played as a midfielder for AEL Limassol and APOEL. He was capped twice for the Cyprus national football team in 1987.

Managerial statistics

References

1964 births
Living people
Sportspeople from Limassol
Cypriot football managers
APOEL FC players
Apollon Limassol FC managers
AEL Limassol players
AEL Limassol managers
Cyprus national football team managers
Association footballers not categorized by position
Cypriot footballers